The state of Wyoming, being a land locked state, has a wide variety of freshwater fish in its lakes, rivers, and streams.

References 

 “Wyoming Fishing Network: Species of Fish in Wyoming.” Accessed April 27, 2020. https://wyomingfishing.net/species.htm.
 “Wyoming Game and Fish Department - Native Fish Species of Wyoming.” Accessed April 27, 2020. https://wgfd.wyo.gov/Fishing-and-Boating/Fish-of-Wyoming/Native-Fish-Species-of-Wyoming.
 “Wyoming Game and Fish Department - Non Native Fish Species of Wyoming.” Accessed April 27, 2020. https://wgfd.wyo.gov/Fishing-and-Boating/Fish-of-Wyoming/Non-Native-Fish-Species-of-Wyoming.
 Accessed April 27, 2020. http://projects.warnercnr.colostate.edu/cofishguide/index.cfm?step=literature.

Fish
Wyoming